Laurie R. Godfrey (born August 27, 1945) is an American paleontologist and physical anthropologist. She is emeritus professor of anthropology at the University of Massachusetts Amherst. Her research has focused on the evolutionary history of the present-day lemur populations of Madagascar. An outspoken critic of creationism and advocate for the teaching of evolution in schools, she has edited three books on the subject: Scientists Confront Creationism (1983), What Darwin Began: Modern Darwinian and Non-Darwinian Perspectives on Evolution (1985), and (with A.J. Petto) Scientists Confront Intelligent Design and Creationism (2007).

References

External links

Living people
1945 births
American women anthropologists
American paleontologists
Women paleontologists
Harvard University alumni
University of Massachusetts Amherst faculty
Critics of creationism
Physical anthropologists
American anthropologists
American women academics
21st-century American women